Thomas Kirker (1760February 19, 1837) was a Democratic-Republican politician from Ohio. He served as the second governor of Ohio.

Biography
Kirker was born in County Tyrone in the Kingdom of Ireland. He moved with his family to Lancaster, Pennsylvania in 
1779. Kirker married Sarah Smith in 1790, and moved with his wife to Kentucky. Three years later, they moved to Liberty Township, Adams County, Ohio.  Kirker was a consistent Presbyterian, serving as an elder in the West Union congregation from 1808 until his death.

Career
He was a delegate to the Ohio Constitutional Convention in 1802.  He served in the first Ohio House of Representatives in 1803 and then in the Ohio State Senate from 1803 to 1815.

While serving as Speaker of the Senate, Kirker became Governor upon the resignation of Edward Tiffin to take a seat in the U.S. Senate. Kirker's term was extended through the 1807–1808 meeting of the Assembly due to the disqualification of Return J. Meigs Jr. who had won the 1807 election to the governorship but had been disqualified by the Assembly as he had not met the residency requirements.

Kirker ran for re-election in 1808, but lost badly to Samuel Huntington. Kirker later returned to the Assembly, serving in the House of Representatives from 1816 to 1817 and in the State Senate from 1821 to 1825.

He was the Ohio Presidential elector in 1824 for Henry Clay.

Kirker retired from politics, and returned to his home at his Liberty Township farm. He died on February 19, 1837. Upon his death he was buried in a family burial plot on the farm.

See also

List of U.S. state governors born outside the United States

References

1760 births
1837 deaths
American Presbyterians
Governors of Ohio
Speakers of the Ohio House of Representatives
Presidents of the Ohio State Senate
People from Adams County, Ohio
Ohio Democratic-Republicans
Ohio Constitutional Convention (1802)
1824 United States presidential electors
Irish emigrants to the United States (before 1923)
Irish-American culture in Ohio
Democratic-Republican Party state governors of the United States
Members of the Ohio House of Representatives
19th-century American politicians